is a Japanese former swimmer. She competed in the women's 400 metre individual medley at the 1964 Summer Olympics.

References

External links
 

1947 births
Living people
Olympic swimmers of Japan
Swimmers at the 1964 Summer Olympics
Place of birth missing (living people)
Japanese female medley swimmers